House temple is a private Jain shrine that is placed within a personal residence.

House temple may also refer to:

 House church (Russia), sometimes literally translated as "house temple"
 House of the Temple, a Masonic Temple in Washington D.C.

See also 
 House church (disambiguation)
 Temple House (disambiguation)